Prochoreutis hestiarcha is a moth in the family Choreutidae. It was described by Edward Meyrick in 1912. It is found in Assam in India and in China (Shillong, Guangdong).

References

Prochoreutis
Moths described in 1912